Red Molly is a folk trio consisting of Laurie MacAllister (vocals, bass), Abbie Gardner (vocals, guitar, Dobro, lap steel guitar), and Molly Venter (vocals, guitar). They perform original works composed by each of the group members as well as other songwriters, such as Hank Williams, Gillian Welch, Richard Thompson, Mark Erelli, Jake Armerding, Ryan Adams and Amy Speace. Their fans are known as "Redheads".

History
Red Molly was formed late one night at the 2004 Falcon Ridge Folk Festival. MacAllister, Gardner, and Carolann Solebello, three solo singer-songwriters, were the last ones left at a song circle. They liked the way they sounded together and decided to form a band. The name Red Molly is taken from a character in the Richard Thompson song "1952 Vincent Black Lightning."

Their career started to take off in 2006. They were the top vote getters in the 2006 Falcon Ridge Folk Festival Emerging Artist Showcase.  WUMB in Boston named them Top New Artist of the Year and picked their Album Never Been to Vegas as one of their Top Albums of 2006. 

In 2007 they toured with Pat Wictor and Ellis, the other winners of the Falcon Ridge Emerging Artist showcase, on the Falcon Ridge Preview tour and performed with them in the Most Wanted Song Swap at the Festival itself.

Their album Love and Other Tragedies reached number 15 on the Americana Charts on June 30, 2008. James reached number 4 on the same chart in May 2010. Light in the Sky was released on October 4, 2011.

On June 15, 2010, Red Molly announced that Carolann Solebello would be leaving the group and replaced by Molly Venter. On July 24 Solebello told the crowd at the Falcon Ridge Folk Festival it was her last show with the band and concluded: "I know about 75% of you by face, and I wanted my last show to be with my friends here at Falcon Ridge, not at some small club in some country I didn't know anybody."  Solebello continues to perform as a solo artist and released her fifth solo album Shiver, in 2018.

Molly Venter's debut with the trio was on August 6, 2010, at the Lunenburg Folk Festival.

On March 26, 2015, Red Molly announced that the band would take an extended hiatus after the conclusion of the 2015 tour on August 25, 2015. The band members have since pursued solo projects. They re-formed in 2017 with a tour that includes appearances in Seattle, Virginia, and New York City.

Discography

Albums
Studio albums

Live albums
2006: Never Been To Vegas Live Album

EPs
2005: Red Molly (4 song EP)
2018: One for All & All for One (6 song EP)

External links
 Band's Homepage

References

American folk musical groups
All-female bands
American bluegrass music groups
2004 establishments in New York (state)
Musical groups established in 2004